Encounters is a card game published by Mayfair Games in 1982.

Gameplay
Encounters is fantasy card game involving heroes fighting against monsters.

Reception
William A. Barton reviewed Encounters in The Space Gamer No. 57. Barton commented that "Encounters is a very playable little game. If you like card games at all and fantasy games in general and don't think [the price] is too steep for one, you'll probably find Encounters an enjoyable investment."

References

Dedicated deck card games
Mayfair Games games